Pollock's Toy Museum is a small, currently closed, museum in London, England.

The museum was started in 1956 in a single attic room at 44 Monmouth Street, near Covent Garden. As the enterprise flourished, other rooms were taken over for the museum and the ground floor became a toyshop. By 1969 the collection had outgrown the Monmouth Street premises and Pollock's Toy Museum moved to 1 Scala Street, with a museum shop on the ground floor to contribute to its support. The museum continues today to be run by the grandson of the founder Marguerite Fawdry.

The museum announced on 18 January 2023 that it had not secured a new lease on its building and was looking for a new venue. The venue was closed, and staff and volunteers moved the stock into storage.

See also
Benjamin Pollock's Toy Shop

References

External links 
Museum website
Behind the Scenes at the Pollocks Toy Theatre Shop Factory Workshop - Photo documentary by John Vickers from the late 1940s

Toy museums in England
Museums established in 1956
Buildings and structures in the London Borough of Camden
Museums in the London Borough of Camden
1956 establishments in England